Have Thase Baap Re is a Gujarati family drama featuring Kiran Kumar and Raunaq Kamdar, Creena Shah, Mamta Chaudhari, Kumkum Das in the lead roles and Shekhar Shukla, Sunil Vishrani, Haresh Dagia, Vaibhavi Bhatt, Jai Krishan Rathod, Anshu Joshi, Rajoo Barot, Sonal Nanavati, Kiran Joshi, Umang Acharya, Raj Dhudhwala, and Manin Trivedi in supporting roles. The film is directed by Nirav Barot and its come back after Thai Jashe and produced by Jignesh Patel from Amdavaad Pictures and co produced by Raj Patel from Ancora Films LLP. The film was released by Rupam Entertainment Pvt Ltd on 18 January 2019.

Cast 
Kiran Kumar as KK 
 Kumkum Das as Kaveri
 Raunaq Kamdar as Aadarsh
 Creena Shah as Aarti
 Mamta Chaudhari as Apoorva
 Shekhar Shukla as Khimji Surati 
Haresh Dagia as Chimanbhai
Vaibhavi Bhatt as Premilaben
 Jai Krishan Rathod as Bipinbhai
 Anshu Joshi as Laljibhai
 Rajoo Barot as Javaharbhai
 Sonal Nanavati as Kailashben
 Kiran Joshi as Karimbhai
 Umang Acharya as Aayan
 Raj Dudhwala as Ritesh
 Manin Trivedi as Ishan

Production

Development
The film was shot in Ahmedabad and Mount Abu under the production of Amdavaad Pictures and Anocra Films LLP in association with DFM Production .

Casting
The theatre artist and Bollywood actor Kiran Kumar was hired for the role of father. The role of money minded son is played by Raunaq Kamdar.

Release
The trailer of the film was released on 24 December 2018.

The film was released on 18 January 2019 in India.

References

External links
 

Films shot in India
Films set in Ahmedabad
Films shot in Ahmedabad
Films shot in Gujarat
2010s Gujarati-language films